Sial refers to the composition of the upper layer of the Earth's crust.

Sial may also refer to:

Places
 Sial, Kapurthala, Punjab State, India
 Sial, Khyber Pakhtunkhwa, Pakistan
 Sial Sharif, a small village in Pakistan

Other uses
 Air Sial, Sialkot, Pakistan, expected to begin operations in 2019
 Sial (tribe), a Jat tribe of the Punjab region
 Heer Sial (disambiguation)